The 1985 Lehigh Engineers football team was an American football team that represented Lehigh University during the 1985 NCAA Division I-AA football season. 

In their tenth and final year under head coach John Whitehead, the Engineers compiled a 5–6 record. Marty Horn and Wes Walton were the team captains.

This would be Lehigh's final year as an independent, before joining the Colonial League. Future league opponents on the Engineers' 1985 schedule included Bucknell, Colgate and Lafayette. The league was later renamed Patriot League, and continues to be Lehigh's home conference as of 2020.

Lehigh played its home games at Taylor Stadium on the university's main campus in Bethlehem, Pennsylvania.

Schedule

References

Lehigh
Lehigh Mountain Hawks football seasons
Lehigh Engineers football